Alireza Karimi Moghaddam (Born in 1975) is a cartoonist and illustrator. He is best known as the creator of a cartoon character representing the Dutch painter Vincent van Gogh. He has a master's degree in graphic design. He works as a lecturer in graphic design at the  Azad University. As of 2021, he lives in Lisbon.

Awards 

 The “Sandro Carlesso” Special Prize to 48th Edition of the “Umoristi a Marostica”2018.
 The  Special Prize to "SOLIN" Croatia -2019
 Finalists of 15.INTERNATIONAL CARTOON FESTIVAL - SOLIN 2019 (CROATIA)
 Winner of The International Exhibition of satirical graphic bucovina- Romania-2019
 Winner of Kaplanlar International Cartoon-Turkey -2018
 Winner of the 26. International Cartoon Competition The Golden Keg 2020″ / Slovakia
 Second prize of the 7th KalDer Bursa International Cartoon Contest -2020- Turkey
 Winner of the first International Caricature Competition / syria-2019

References

External links 
 
 
 
 
 
 

Living people
1975 births
Iranian illustrators
Islamic Azad University alumni